Gamrie Bay is a bay in Aberdeenshire, Scotland. The bay is between Crovie Head and More Head. The villages of Gardenstown and Crovie are located within the bay. A hill fort and the later Castle of Findon stood near the bay entrance of Kirk Den. The ruins of St John’s Church, the former parish church are located at the western end of the bay.

References

External links 
Lewis, Samuel. A Topographical Dictionary of Scotland: From Abbey to Jura. Volume 1 de A Topographical Dictionary of Scotland: Comprising the Several Counties, Islands, Cities, Burgh and Market Towns, Parishes, and Principal Villages, with Historical and Statistical Descriptions ; Embellished with a Large Map of Scotland, and Engravings of the Seals and Arms of the Different Burghs and Universities. S. Lewis and Company, 1846.

Bays of Aberdeenshire